Bernard Jenny (18 March 1931 – 5 March 2011) was a French dramatist, theatre director and scenic designer. He directed the Théâtre de Lutèce until 1958 and was director of the Théâtre du Vieux-Colombier from 1959 to 1970.

Television 
 1987 : , episode Maigret's Failure by Gilles Katz

Theatre 
Comedian
 1956 : La corde pour te pendre by Frédéric Valmain after Malice by Pierre Mac Orlan, directed by Bernard Jenny, Comédie de Paris
 1956 : La Cuisine des anges by Albert Husson, directed by Christian-Gérard, Théâtre des Célestins
 1957 : La Carmen by André de Richaud, directed by Bernard Jenny, Théâtre de Lutèce

Dramatist
 1983 : Stanislas l'enchanteur by and directed by Bernard Jenny, Semaine du théâtre, Le Maillon, Strasbourg
 1984 : Sila, princesse de Mélimélonie by and directed by Bernard Jenny, Le Maillon, Strasbourg

Theatre director
 1955 : The Man with the Flower in His Mouth by Luigi Pirandello, Studio des Champs-Élysées
 1956 : Sisyphe et le mort by Robert Merle, Théâtre de Lutèce 
 1956 : Le Pauvre Bougre et le Bon Génie by Alphonse Allais, Théâtre de Lutèce
 1956 : La corde pour te pendre by Frédéric Valmain after Malice by Pierre Mac Orlan, Comédie de Paris
 1957 : The Love of Don Perlimplín and Belisa in the Garden by Federico García Lorca, Théâtre de Lutèce 
 1957 : La Carmen by André de Richaud, Théâtre de Lutèce 
 1960 : Das Käthchen von Heilbronn by Heinrich von Kleist, Théâtre de l'Alliance française
 1960 : Christobal de Lugo by Loys Masson, Théâtre du Vieux-Colombier
 1961 : Arden de Feversham Théâtre du Vieux-Colombier
 1962 : Polyeucte by Corneille, Théâtre du Vieux-Colombier
 1962 : L'Otage by Paul Claudel, Théâtre du Vieux-Colombier
 1962 : Le Pain dur by Paul Claudel, Théâtre du Vieux-Colombier
 1962 : Le Père humilié by Paul Claudel, Théâtre du Vieux-Colombier
 1963 : Blood Wedding by Federico Garcia Lorca, Théâtre du Vieux-Colombier
 1964 : Yerma by Federico Garcia Lorca, Théâtre Hébertot
 1964-1965 : Lucrezia Borgia by Victor Hugo, Théâtre du Vieux-Colombier, Ancient Theatre of Fourvière Lyon, Festival de Montauban, Théâtre des Galeries Brussels 
 1965 : Liolà by Luigi Pirandello, Théâtre du Vieux-Colombier
 1965 : Saint-Euloge de Cordoue by Maurice Clavel, Théâtre du Vieux-Colombier
 1967 : Et moi aussi j'existe by Georges Neveux, Théâtre du Vieux-Colombier
 1967 : Des petits bonhommes dans du papier journal by Jean-Claude Darnal, Théâtre du Vieux-Colombier
 1968 : Polyeucte by Corneille, Théâtre du Vieux-Colombier
 1968 : Mithridate by Racine, Théâtre du Vieux-Colombier
 1968 : Biedermann und die Brandstifter by Max Frisch, Théâtre du Vieux-Colombier
 1969 : Tartuffe by Molière, Théâtre du Vieux-Colombier
 1969 : Platonov by Anton Chekhov, Théâtre du Vieux-Colombier
 1977 : Le Chariot d'or by Mario Gautherat, Théâtre Municipal at Strasbourg then Mulhouse
 1981 : La Voyage by Martin Graff and Roger Siffer, Pléiade d'Alsace Strasbourg Le Maillon
 1982 : Dieu est alsacienne by Martin Graff and Roger Siffer, Le Maillon, Strasbourg
 1983 : Stanislas l'enchanteur by Bernard Jenny, Le Maillon, Strasbourg
 1984 : La Voix humaine by Jean Cocteau, Le Maillon, Strasbourg
 1984 : Sila, princesse de mélimélonie by Bernard Jenny, Le Maillon, Strasbourg
 1985 : The Little Prince by Antoine de Saint-Exupéry, Théâtre La Choucrouterie, Strasbourg
 1985 : Mangeront-ils ? by Victor Hugo, Le Maillon Strasbourg et Septembre artistique, Nancy

Scenic designer
 1969 : Platonov'' by Anton Chekhov, Théâtre du Vieux-Colombier

References

External links 
Les Archives du Spectacle

20th-century French dramatists and playwrights
French theatre directors
French scenic designers
People from Strasbourg
1931 births
2011 deaths